Mad Atom was a game development studio founded in October 2011 and based in Brighton, UK.
Mad Atom was founded by ex-employees of Disney's Black Rock Studio in June, 2011.

The studio's debut title was Monkey Slam, released 6 September 2012 on iOS and published by Chillingo.
MadAtom collaborated with Boss Alien in creating the Mac version of CSR Racing.
CSR Classics, released in October 2013 on iOS and was  developed by Boss Alien in collaboration with Mad Atom Games and published by NaturalMotion Games. CSR Classics features similar game mechanics to its sister title but features classic race cars from the 1950s to the 1970s.

Company defunct (dissolved) as of 2019

Games Developed

References

External links
 Mad Atom website

Companies established in 2011
Defunct video game companies of the United Kingdom